Bird Road, co-signed State Road 976 (SR 976) from the Homestead Extension of Florida's Turnpike (SR 821) in Westwood Lakes, Florida to U.S. Route 1 (SR 5) in Miami, is a  main east–west road running south of downtown Miami in Miami-Dade County, Florida.

Route description

State Road 976 begins on Bird Road at the Homestead Extension of Florida's Turnpike in Westwood Lakes, heading east as a primarily commercial six lane divided highway, including many strip malls on its route.  It crosses State Road 985 before leaving Westwood Lakes and entering Westchester.  Between SW 94th Avenue and SW 92nd Avenue, Bird Road passes by Bird Bowl, one of the few remaining bowling establishments in Miami-Dade County.  Bird Road then crosses State Road 973 (Galloway Road), and borders the northern end of Tropical Park, the former site of a race track that had its heyday in the 1950s and 1960s, and now a Miami-Dade County park.  At the northeastern border of Tropical Park, SR 976 has an interchange with the Palmetto Expressway.  At the southeast corner of its intersection of Ludlam Road, a block of vintage stores lines the road.  At State Road 959, the road enters Coral Gables, with the median of the road containing spreading banyan trees, similar to the nearby Coral Way.  Between State Road 959 (Red Road) and State Road 953 (LeJeune Road), the road is primarily residential, crossing a couple of golf courses.  East of SR 953 and Coral Gables Senior High School, it resumes commercial businesses, and has intersections with Ponce De Leon Boulevard, where the median disappears, and quickly heads towards its eastern terminus of US 1.

East of State Road 976's eastern terminus, Bird Road becomes SE 40th Street/Bird Avenue as it traverses the Coconut Grove neighborhood of Miami, intersecting SW 27th Avenue and ending at Aviation Avenue one block further east.

West of State Road 976's western terminus, the road jogs slightly to the south to become SW 42nd Street, and known as Bird Road or Bird Drive, as it goes through a primarily residential area, with several businesses and strip malls scattered through.  Bird Drive currently ends at SW 162nd Avenue, but more development continues to be built in this area and the road may be extended further west in the future.

History

SR 976
When FDOT added Bird Road to its list of state roads in 1980, it was originally designated State Road 930.  Three years later the SR 930 signs were removed from the street and replaced with signs with the SR 976 designation.

Bird Road was named after Reverend C.S. and Molly Piercy Bird, who had homesteaded 160 acres that includes the current Biltmore Golf Course.  Bird Road evolved from the trail C.S. Bird had blazed from Miami to his homestead.

Major intersections

References

Roads in Miami-Dade County, Florida